Karsten Gundermann (born 1 October 1966) is a German composer.

Life 
Born in Dresden, Gundermann attended Hans Jürgen Wenzel's children's composer class and then studied at the Dresdner Musikhochschule with Udo Zimmermann.

From 1990 he studied at the National Academy for Chinese Theatre in Beijing. In 1993 he composed there the Beijing Opera The Nightingale based on a fairy tale by Hans Christian Andersen. The opera was performed in 2010 as part of the Rheingau Musik Festival at Palais am Zoo in Frankfurt.

In 2003 he composed the Chinese-German Seasons and Times of Day based on the eponymous cycle of poems by Johann Wolfgang von Goethe, commissioned by the RIAS Kammerchores and the Concerto Köln.

Films 
 2002: 
 2002: Abgedreht
 2010: Faust II reloaded – Den lieb ich, der Unmögliches begehrt!

Writings 
 Echt clever! Geniale Erfindungen aus Hamburg.
 Secret Sounds Musik und Klang aus China.

References

External links 
 
Karsten Gundermann in the Archive of Contemporary Composers of the Sächsische Landesbibliothek – Staats- und Universitätsbibliothek Dresden
 Porträt: Karsten Gundermann Online-Magazin des Goethe-Instituts China, June 2010
 

1966 births
Living people
Musicians from Dresden
German composers
20th-century classical composers
German film score composers